The Bedia Chalice  is a piece of the medieval Georgian goldsmithery, a liturgical vessel made of ducat gold and richly decorated. Only the bowl of the vessel is preserved and currently kept at the Georgian National Museum in Tbilisi.

History 
The chalice was a donation by King Bagrat III and his mother, Queen Gurandukht, to the new church at Bedia, which was completed in 999. The base of the vessel was subsequently lost and restored in the 16th century at the behest of Germane Chkhetidze, Metropolitan Bishop of Bedia, as mentioned in a Georgian inscription. The item was preserved in the sacristy of the Ilori Church, when the historian Dimitri Bakradze visited it in 1865 and reported the danger of its being lost. The base then again disappeared. The surviving bowl was removed to Tbilisi, in the Treasure Chamber of the Georgian State Art Museum, now Georgian National Museum, in 1930.

Description 
The bowl of the Bedia vessel is 14 cm high and 14 cm in diameter; it weighs 752 g. The piece is made of one sheet of gold, with all figures and details worked in repoussé. The entire outer surface is framed and divided into 12 segments by a continuous arcade. The figures depicted are the enthroned Christ Pantokrator and the Virgin Hodegetria on the opposite side. Between them are standing figures of ten apostles, five on each side, holding rotuli in their hands. Christ is identified by a Greek inscription and all apostles by the Georgian texts; there is no inscription associated with the Virgin. The Georgian-language inscription just below the rim, in finely carved asomtavruli script, mentions King Bagrat and Queen Gurandukht.

The Bedia chalice is notable for the orderly and rhythmic composition and decorative details which are endogenously Georgian, but exhibit some stylistic affinities with the contemporary Byzantine ivory icons and enameled chalices in the Treasury of San Marco, Venice. Yet, robust monumental effect of the artwork of the Bedia chalice is unparalleled.

Notes

References 

Gold objects
Art of Georgia (country)
Chalices
History of Abkhazia